Niegardów  is a village in the administrative district of Gmina Koniusza, within Proszowice County, Lesser Poland Voivodeship, in southern Poland.

References

See also
 Lesser Polish Way

Villages in Proszowice County